Sevastopol: On Photographs of War, by William Allen, is a book of poems written in English.

Synopsis 
Poetic responses to photographs taken in times of war. The reader looks at the photo on the left page and measures the author's response on the right, meanwhile living through trying moments in history.

Summary 
Sevastopol is a response to photographs of war, from the earliest days of photography to the television broadcasts of our times. We see, in passing, the Crimean War of 1854, the American Civil War, World War I, World War II, Vietnam and tragedies of unnamed wars today. Some of the photographers are famous — Mathew Brady, Ansel Adams; many are not; most are anonymous.

One photographer, Kevin Carter, who snapped a picture of a starving child with a vulture waiting in the background — committed suicide.  For each photograph, the poet, William Allen, allows himself a 100-word response. We look at the photograph on the left page, form our own impressions and then compare them with what the poet felt and expressed on the right page. In this way, one by one, we are led on a tour through sombre moments of history, yet at the same time come in touch with our private psychological and political mappings of life at risk. The power of word and image together makes Sevastopol an unusual and moving poetic experience, linking us with those who did not escape the horrors and misery of man's most grisly occupation.

Reviews 
"William Allen's book of poems, based on photographs of war and its aftermath and the truth, is a book of profound conscience. It conveys deep understanding of the inhumane folly of war and its useless, needless sufferings in vivid language which augments stark visual imagery. Sevastopol is the work of an outraged heart wrought with emotive power--an important book." Daniela Gioseffi, author of Women and War.
Ploughshares, the Literary Journal at Emerson College

Editions 
Grand Terrace, CA: Xenos Books.   (paper), 90 p.

Poetry collections